The Bow Range is a mountain range of the Canadian Rockies in Alberta and British Columbia, Canada. The range is named in associated with the Bow River and was officially adopted on March 31, 1917 by the Geographic Board of Canada.

It is a part of the Banff-Lake Louise Core Area of the Southern Continental Ranges, located on the Continental Divide, west of the Bow River valley, in Banff National Park and Kootenay National Park.

The Bow Range covers a surface area of 717 km2 (277 mi2), has a length of 34 km (from north to south) and a maximum width of 43 km. The range also covers the Valley of the Ten Peaks, with the tallest of the ten being Mount Hungabee at 3492 metres. The range also has hiking areas such as the Consolation Lakes, Sentinel Pass-Larch Valley, Wenkchenma Pass-Eiffel Lake, the Beehive plain of the Six Glaciers system and Saddle Back Pass.



Peaks and mountains

See also
 Ranges of the Canadian Rockies

References

External links
 Bow Range in the Canadian Mountain Encyclopedia

Ranges of the Canadian Rockies
Mountain ranges of Alberta
Mountain ranges of British Columbia
Mountains of Banff National Park